Jamy may refer to:


Places
Jamy, Lublin Voivodeship, east Poland
Jamy, Opole Voivodeship, south-west Poland
Jamy, Podkarpackie Voivodeship, south-east Poland
Jamy, Pomeranian Voivodeship, north Poland
Jámy, Czech Republic

People
Jamy Franco (born 1991), Guatemalan race walker
Jamy Gourmaud, French journalist
Jamy Ian Swiss, American magician

Characters
Jamy, a Scottish soldier in Shakespeare's Henry V

See also
Jamie, a given name